Stord Idrettslag is a sports club located in Stord, Norway. The club was founded as Stord Turn og idrettslag (Stord T&IL) on 30 March 1914, and today it has sections for athletics, basketball, gymnastics, handball, football, orienteering, volleyball, skiing, speed skating and swimming. The club formerly had a section for wrestling.

History
The club was founded on 30 March 1914 as Stord Turn og idrettslag. In 2001, this name was changed to the current name, Stord Idrettslag.

Football

History
The men's football team currently plays in 3. divisjon, the fourth tier of the Norwegian football league system. They played in the second tier for two consecutive seasons in 1989 and 1990.

Stord/Moster and Stord Sunnhordland FK (2002–2006)

In 2002, Stord's senior team merged with Moster IL and created Stord/Moster. The goal for the merger was to create a new elite team which could have wider support inn the Sunnhordland region. Stord/Moster won the 2003 3. divisjon, but lost to Norheimsund IL in the playoff to the 2. divisjon.

In 2006, the club got new owners and changed its name from Stord/Moster to Stord Sunnhordland on 15 March 2006. In December 2006, it was decided to discontinue the club. Its spot in the league system and its squad was transferred back to Stord IL. The chairman of the new limited company Sunnhordland Toppfotball, which now supported the club, said that Stord Sunnhordland had "been a club without soul".

Recent years (2007–present)
In the 2013 season, Stord Fotball promoted to the third tier, but were relegated back to the fourth tier in the following season. They repeated this feat in 2015 through winning their group in the 2015 3. divisjon, but a twelfth-place finish in the 2016 2. divisjon saw Stord relegate back to the 3. divisjon, where they currently plays.

Recent men's football seasons
{|class="wikitable"
|-bgcolor="#efefef"
! Season
!
! Pos.
! Pl.
! W
! D
! L
! GS
! GA
! P
!Cup
!Notes
!Ref.
|-
|2013 
|3. divisjon
|align=right bgcolor=#DDFFDD| 1
|align=right|26||align=right|16||align=right|6||align=right|4
|align=right|80||align=right|33||align=right|54
|Second qualifying round
|Promoted to 2. divisjon
|
|-
|2014 
|2. divisjon
|align=right bgcolor="#FFCCCC"| 13
|align=right|26||align=right|7||align=right|6||align=right|13
|align=right|43||align=right|62||align=right|27
|Second round
|Relegated to 3. divisjon
|
|-
|2015 
|3. divisjon
|align=right bgcolor=#DDFFDD| 1
|align=right|26||align=right|16||align=right|5||align=right|5
|align=right|76||align=right|37||align=right|53
|First round
|Promoted to 2. divisjon
|
|-
|2016 
|2. divisjon
|align=right bgcolor="#FFCCCC"| 12
|align=right|26||align=right|6||align=right|6||align=right|14
|align=right|36||align=right|65||align=right|24
|First round
|Relegated to 3. divisjon
|
|-
|2017 
|3. divisjon
|align=right|10
|align=right|26||align=right|8||align=right|6||align=right|12
|align=right|48||align=right|58||align=right|30
|First round
|
|
|-
|2018 
|3. divisjon
|align=right|10
|align=right|26||align=right|8||align=right|6||align=right|12
|align=right|51||align=right|62||align=right|30
|First qualifying round
|
|
|-
|2019 
|3. divisjon
|align=right|6
|align=right|26||align=right|12||align=right|4||align=right|10
|align=right|70||align=right|48||align=right|40
|Second qualifying round
|
|
|}

Handball
The men's team in Stord Handball currently plays in the third tier of Norwegian handball. The team played twelve consecutive seasons in the top flight before they were relegated from the 2010–11 season.

References

External links
 Official site 

Sports teams in Norway
Football clubs in Norway
Association football clubs established in 1914
1914 establishments in Norway
Athletics clubs in Norway
Stord
Sport in Hordaland